Varlam Liparteliani (born 27 February 1989) is a Georgian judoka. He has won silver at Olympic and World level.

Career
He competed at the 2012 Summer Olympics in the -90 kg event and lost in the second round to Mark Anthony. At the European Judo Championships, Liparteliani won gold in 2012, 2014 and 2016, silver in 2009 European Judo Championships, 2010 European Judo Championships, 2013 European Judo Championships and 2015 European Judo Championships, and bronze in 2011 European Judo Championships.

He is the captain of the Georgia Judo National Team and the Georgia Olympic Team. He is coached by Gugava Giorgi.

At the 2016 Olympic Games, he won the silver medal.  He beat Komronshokh Ustopiriyon, Ovini Uera, Lkhagvasürengiin Otgonbaatar and Gwak Dong-han before losing to Mashu Baker in the final.

Liparteliani's favourite skill is uchi mata. He is currently ranked No. 1 in the world (as of 25 September 2018).

In 2021, he won the gold medal in his event at the 2021 Judo World Masters held in Doha, Qatar.

Personal life
Liparteliani began judo aged 11. His inspirations were Japanese legend Kōsei Inoue and fellow Georgian judoka Zurab Zviadauri. He is married and has three sons.

Liparteliani was involved in a car accident with teammate Avtandil Tchrikishvili during a training camp in Borjomi, Georgia, right before the 2012 Olympics. The passengers in the car were heavily injured, but survived.

Competitive record

(as of 25 September 2018)

Achievements

Medals

2010
 Grand Prix, Tunis
 Grand Slam, Rio de Janeiro
 Grand Prix, Rotterdam
2011
 Grand Prix, Abu Dhabi
2012
 Grand Prix, Düsseldorf
 Grand Slam, Rio de Janeiro
2013
 Grand Slam, Paris
 Grand Prix, Düsseldorf
 World Masters, Tyumen
 Grand Slam, Tokyo
2014
 Grand Slam, Paris
 Grand Prix, Havana
2015
 Grand Prix, Düsseldorf
 Grand Prix, Tbilisi
 Grand Slam, Paris
2016
 Grand Slam, Paris
2017
 Grand Prix, Zagreb
 Grand Slam, Paris
 Grand Prix, Ekaterinburg
 World Masters, St. Petersburg
2018
 Grand Slam, Paris
 Grand Slam, Düsseldorf
 World Masters, Guangzhou
2019
 Grand Slam, Paris

References

External links
 
 
 
 

Male judoka from Georgia (country)
1989 births
People from Mtskheta
Living people
Olympic judoka of Georgia (country)
Judoka at the 2012 Summer Olympics
Judoka at the 2016 Summer Olympics
Judoka at the 2015 European Games
European Games medalists in judo
European Games silver medalists for Georgia (country)
Olympic silver medalists for Georgia (country)
Olympic medalists in judo
Medalists at the 2016 Summer Olympics
Judoka at the 2019 European Games
Judoka at the 2020 Summer Olympics